Laird is a township and village in the Algoma District in Northern Ontario, Canada. The township had a population of 1,047 in the Canada 2016 Census, down from 1,057 in the 2011 census.

Communities
The township includes the named communities of Laird and Neebish. It also includes a portion of Bar River, a small hamlet straddling the boundary between the townships of Laird and Macdonald, Meredith and Aberdeen Additional.

Demographics 

Population trend:
 Population in 2016: 1,047
 Population in 2011: 1,057
 Population in 2006: 1,078
 Population in 2001: 1,021
 Population in 1996: 1,073
 Population in 1991: 997

Transportation

Highway 17 passes through the township. Tarbutt is a neighbour of Laird and is separated by a low-grade dirt road called "Townline Road" which spurs into a road to Pine Island.

See also
List of townships in Ontario

References

External links 

Municipalities in Algoma District
Single-tier municipalities in Ontario
Township municipalities in Ontario